The 1978–79 Australian region cyclone season was the only season in which a reconnaissance aircraft flew into a tropical cyclone. Operationally, Australia's Bureau of Meteorology (BOM) tracked eleven tropical cyclones, while two additional systems were later added to the United States's Joint Typhoon Warning Center (JTWC) best track. Prior to 1985, the Australian region basin was defined as in the southern hemisphere between 80°E and 160°E, with the modern day season boundaries ranging from 1 November to 30 April of the following year. The first storm, an unnamed system, developed on 19 November 1978. The final cyclone, Kevin, dissipated by 12 May 1979. Tropical cyclones in this area were monitored by three Tropical Cyclone Warning Centres (TCWCs): the BOM in Perth, Darwin, and Brisbane.

Tropical cyclogenesis in the season began when an unnamed tropical cyclone developed well west of Australia on 19 November and lasted until 23 November after moving in a generally southward direction throughout much of its duration. Cyclone Peter developed over the Gulf of Carpentaria on 29 December. During and in the few days after landfall in Queensland on 31 December, the storm produced heavy precipitation in the state and became the rainiest tropical cyclone in Australia. Severe flooding occurred in the Cairns area, leaving two fatalities and about $10 million in damage. Gordon became the first system to enter from another basin, entering from the South Pacific on 9 January. The storm dissipated shortly after striking Queensland on 12 January, bringing rainfall and rough seas.

Cyclone Kerry remained in the Australian region from 12 February to 3 March, making it the longest-lived tropical cyclone in the basin on record. Hazel was the most intense tropical cyclone of the season, peaking as a Category 4 on the Australian tropical cyclone intensity scale. The storm brought rough seas and strong winds to Western Australia, resulting in $20 million in damage and 15 deaths after a fishing boat capsized. None of the subsequent tropical cyclones significantly effected land. Tropical cyclogenesis concluded with the formation of Kevin on 2 May, which dissipated on 12 May. Overall, the tropical cyclones of this season collectively caused 17 deaths and over $30 million in damage.

Season summary 

Under the modern day boundaries, a season lasts from 1 November to 30 April of the following year, while a tropical cyclone year is defined as from 1 July to 30 June of the next year. Thirteen cyclones entered or formed in the Australian region, which was equal to the 1970–71 to 2001–02 average of 13 per season. By region, three cyclones developed over the Perth TCWC, three formed in the Darwin TCWC, and just one originated over the Brisbane area. Thus, seven cyclones developed in the Australian region – defined as the southern hemisphere between 80°E and 160°E – until Météo-France's Réunion area of responsibility and BOM adjusted the boundary eastward to 90°E in 1985. This was slightly below the 1952–53 to 1970–71 average of eight per season.

There was a total of eleven coastal crossings, which is either a landfall or a tropical cyclone moving from land to sea. This was well above the 1949–50 to 1974–75 average of five per season. This was the first and only season that reconnaissance aircraft flew into cyclones in this basin. A WP-3D Orion operated by the United States's National Oceanic and Atmospheric Administration (NOAA) flew into Cyclone Kerry on three occasions – 21 February, 22 February, and 4 March. Another flight mission was conducted for observing Cyclone Rosa as the storm was making landfall in Northern Territory on 26 February. Overall, the tropical cyclones of this season resulted in 17 deaths and slightly more than $30 million in damage.

Activity began in November 1978, when Tropical Cyclone 01S formed the Australian region in the Perth TCWC area on 18 November. The next cyclone, later designated as 03S, developed about a month later on 20 December. In addition, Peter formed on 29 December. January also featured two more cyclones, Greta and Gordon, the latter of which entered the basin from the South Pacific on 9 January. Likewise, there were two tropical cyclones in the month of February, Rosa and Kerry, both of which existed simultaneously for almost three weeks. Hazel and Ivan originated in March. April was the most active, with three cyclones originating or entering the basin during that month. The last storm, Kevin existed in May between 2 May and 12 May, after the end of the modern day season, which is 30 April.

Systems

Cyclone 01S 

After six hours, the storm intensified into a Category 1 cyclone on the Australian tropical cyclone intensity scale. Early on 21 November, the system curved west-southwestward, before turning on the following day.

Cyclone 03S 

The storm strengthened and became a Category 1 cyclone about twelve hours later. After initially moving east-southeastward, the system re-curved to the west-southwest by 21 December. Thereafter, the cyclone slowly weakened and fell to tropical depression intensity on 24 December. Several hours later, the system entered the southwest Indian Ocean basin, where it dissipated on 26 December.

Severe Tropical Cyclone Peter 

A weak low pressure area over the Arafura Sea developed into Cyclone Peter on 29 December. Peter moved southeastward and deepened while brushing Arnhem Land. Initially a tropical low, it strengthened into a Category 1 cyclone by 12:00 UTC on 29 December. Peter intensified further on 30 December and became a Category 2 cyclone. Peter weakened to a Category 1 cyclone before making landfall near the mouth of the Edward River in Queensland. While crossing the Cape York Peninsula, the storm weakened slowly.

Severe flooding occurred, especially in the Cairns area. The most severe damage was dealt to sugar cane, which suffered 70 to 90 percent destruction. Some flights were canceled at the Cairns Airport due to standing water. Floodwaters forced at least 50 people to flee their homes in Cairns. A number of roads, including major highways, were flooded throughout coastal areas of Far North Queensland. Rainfall and winds also resulted in many power and telephone service outages through the region. There were two fatalities and damage reached approximately $10 million.

Tropical Cyclone Greta 

A weak low pressure area associated with the remnants of Peter developed into a tropical disturbance over the Gulf of Carpentaria on 8 January. After six hours, the disturbance intensified into a tropical low, which was named Greta. Moving east-northeast, the system strengthened into a Category 1 cyclone late on 9 January. A few hours later, the system made landfall to the south of Weipa, Queensland. While traversing the Cape York Peninsula, the cyclone weakened, falling to Category 1 intensity by midday on 10 January.

Eventually, Greta curved southward and briefly moved offshore, before making another landfall near Princess Charlotte Bay early on 11 January. The storm curved west-southwestward and soon weakened to a tropical low. After re-emerging into the Gulf of Carpentaria again on 12 January, Greta almost immediately weakened to a tropical disturbance. The storm then meandered offshore Gulf Country before dissipating around 00:00 UTC on 13 January. Greta brought rainfall to portions of the Cape York Peninsula flooded during the passage of Cyclone Peter, but the former resulted in much less damage than the latter.

Tropical Cyclone Gordon 

However, between 7 January and 8 January, satellite imagery indicated a significant weakening trend. Upon reaching the Australian region early on 9 January, Gordon had deteriorated to a Category 1.

Weakening continued, with Gordon decreasing to a tropical low on 10 January, following by to tropical disturbance intensity on 11 January. Several hours later, Gordon made landfall near Proserpine, Queensland, and promptly dissipated. However, there was no flood damage. Rough seas and strong winds resulted in some beach erosion.

Severe Tropical Cyclone Rosa 

A persistent cluster of clouds over the South Pacific basin developed into a tropical low, named Rosa, near the Solomon Islands on 12 February. Shortly thereafter, Rosa entered the Australian region. Initially, the system remained weak and moved across the Cape York Peninsula on 16 February. Upon reaching the Gulf of Carpentaria, the storm slowly strengthened and moved in an erratic motion. The cyclone then made landfall near Bing Bong. Northern Territory, at the same intensity. Rosa moved west-southwestward across Australia and dissipated offshore Western Australia near Exmouth on 4 March.

Observation stations in the southwest Gulf of Carpentaria reported abnormally high tides. On Groote Eylandt island, a tide gauge was washed away. These weather stations suffered thousands of dollars in damage. Trees in extensive tracts of forests were felled, especially in the Roper-McArthur district, which stretches from the Roper to McArthur rivers. On North Island, located within the Sir Edward Pellew Group of Islands, a stranded light aircraft was destroyed.

Severe Tropical Cyclone Kerry 

Kerry developed over the South Pacific basin from a low pressure area on 12 February. After later striking Makira in the Solomon Islands on 15 February, Kerry reached the Bureau of Meteorology's area of responsibility on 16 February as a Category 2 cyclone. Shortly thereafter, the system became a Category 3 cyclone. After peak intensity, the storm began to move erratically, executing multiple cyclonic loops and decelerating between 20 February and 25 February. At that time, Kerry weakened significantly due to dry air, falling to Category 3 on 21 February and Category 2 on 24 February. The storm curved southwestward by 26 February and deteriorated to a Category 1 later that day. Shortly thereafter, Kerry turned westward and began approaching the east coast of Queensland.

Late on 28 February, the cyclone struck the Whitsunday Islands as a Category 1 and later made multiple landfalls on the mainland as a tropical low on 1 March. Kerry curved northward several hours later and re-emerged into the Pacific Ocean. The storm reintensified into a Category 1 on 2 March, before a trough forced the cyclone to curve southeastward. Kerry again weakened while traversing above the Great Barrier Reef and finally dissipated on 5 March. Twenty-seven homes were damaged, one severely, and a warehouse lost a large section of its roof. On Brampton Island, the resort's staff quarters building was deroofed and many trees were downed throughout the island.

Severe Tropical Cyclone Hazel 

Hazel grazed the Western Australia coast on March 13, 1979. Fifteen crewmen drowned when their fishing boat sank during the storm. The storm caused $41 million in damage, among the costliest Western Australian cyclones.

Tropical Cyclone Ivan 

Ivan existed from 16 March to 21 March.

Tropical Cyclone Stan 

Stan existed from 6 April to 15 April.

Tropical Cyclone Jane 

A tropical disturbance formed about 220 mi (135 mi) west-southwest of Cocos Island early on 8 April. Early on the next day, the disturbance strengthened into a tropical low, which was named Jane. Jane dissipated by 14 April.

Severe Tropical Cyclone Idylle 
 Idylle hit the Southern Coast of Western Australia.

Tropical Cyclone Kevin 

Kevin existed from 2 May to 12 May. As it churned in open ocean, it took an unusual "zig-zag" path. Kevin did not strengthen much and dissipated out to sea.

See also 

 Atlantic hurricane seasons: 1978, 1979
 Eastern Pacific hurricane seasons: 1978, 1979
 Western Pacific typhoon seasons: 1978, 1979
 North Indian Ocean cyclone seasons: 1978, 1979

References 

 
Australian region cyclone seasons
Aust
 disasters in Australia
 disasters in Australia
 disasters in Oceania
 disasters in Oceania